Jenny Stene (born 8 March 1998) is a Norwegian sport shooter, born in Lørenskog. She represented Norway at the 2020 Summer Olympics in Tokyo 2021, competing in women's 10 metre air rifle and in 50 metre rifle three positions.

References

External links
 
 
 

1998 births
Living people
People from Lørenskog
Norwegian female sport shooters
Shooters at the 2020 Summer Olympics
Olympic shooters of Norway
European Games competitors for Norway
Shooters at the 2019 European Games
Sportspeople from Viken (county)
21st-century Norwegian women